N41 (also known as LMC N41, LHA 120-N 41) is an emission nebula in the north part of the Large Magellanic Cloud in the Dorado constellation. Originally catalogued in Karl Henize's "Catalogue of H-alpha emission stars and nebulae in the Magellanic Clouds" of 1956, it is approximately 100 light-years wide and 160,000-170,000 light-years distant.

References 

Dorado (constellation)
Large Magellanic Cloud
Emission nebulae
Star-forming regions